Manion Corners is a community in West Carleton-March Ward in Ottawa, Ontario.

Neighbourhoods in Ottawa